Lisa Whiteside (born 17 September 1985 in Chorley) is a British amateur boxer who is affiliated with the JR Gym club.

She has won international championship medals across three weight categories, including two World Championship medals.

References

External links
 
 

1985 births
Living people
English women boxers
Sportspeople from Chorley
Commonwealth Games medallists in boxing
Commonwealth Games gold medallists for England
Boxers at the 2018 Commonwealth Games
Flyweight boxers
Medallists at the 2018 Commonwealth Games